Peter Montgomery may refer to:

 Peter Montgomery (mathematician) (1947–2020), American mathematician
 Peter Montgomery (water polo) (born 1950), Australian former water polo player
 Peter Montgomery (broadcaster), New Zealand sports broadcaster